Deafblindness is the condition of little or no useful hearing and little or no useful sight. Different degrees of vision loss and auditory loss occur within each individual. Because of this inherent diversity, each deafblind individual's needs regarding lifestyle, communication, education, and work need to be addressed based on their degree of dual-modality deprivation, to improve their ability to live independently. In 1994, an estimated 35,000–40,000 United States residents were medically deafblind. Helen Keller was a well-known example of a deafblind individual. To further her lifelong mission to help the deafblind community to expand its horizons and gain opportunities, the Helen Keller National Center for Deaf-Blind Youths and Adults (also called the Helen Keller National Center or HKNC), with a residential training program in Sands Point, New York, was established in 1967 by an act of Congress.

The deafblind community has its own culture, comparable to those of the deaf community and the blind community. Members of the deafblind community have diverse backgrounds but are united by similar experiences and a shared, homogeneous understanding of what it means to be deafblind. Some deafblind individuals view their condition as a part of their identity.

Epidemiology 

The medical condition of deafblindness occurs in different forms. For some, this condition might happen congenitally from birth as a result of genetic defect, for others it happens suddenly due to a form of illness or accident that results in a modality deprivation of either vision or hearing, or both. A person might be born deaf and become blind at a later stage in life, or vice versa. In any given case of deafblindness, many possible onsets and causes of this condition exist; some happen gradually, others happen unexpectedly and suddenly. The diagnosis of deafblindness could be medically classified into specific types based on one's symptoms and causes.

The two overarching types of deafblindness are congenital and acquired.

Congenital deafblindness: the condition of deafblindness from birth
 Pregnancy complexities
 Effects of alcohol/drugs
 Fetal alcohol syndrome
 A result of prematurity
 Causes from illness/infection
 Rubella
 AIDS
 Cytomegalovirus
 Congenital syphilis
 Toxoplasmosis
 Genetic conditions (evident from birth)
 Anomalies/syndromes (numerous genetic defects may contribute to one's medical condition of deafblindness, of which some of more well-known syndromes are listed)
CHARGE syndrome
Cochleosaccular degeneration with progressive cataracts
 Down syndrome
 Marshall syndrome
 Congenital rubella syndrome
 Stickler syndrome
 Trisomy 13
Acquired deafblindness: condition of deafblindness developed later in life
 Genetic conditions (evident at a later stage in life)
Usher syndrome
 Alport syndrome
 Age-related loss of modality (vision or auditory or both)
 Illness, such as meningitis
 Somatic injuries
Brain damage/trauma
 Stroke
 Permanent physical damage (relating to vision or hearing)

Communication 

Deafblind people communicate in many different ways as determined by the nature of their condition, the age of onset, and what resources are available to them. For example, someone who grew up deaf and experienced vision loss later in life is likely to use a sign language (in a visually modified or tactile form). Others who grew up blind and later became deaf are more likely to use a tactile mode of spoken/written language. Methods of communication include:

 Use of residual hearing (speaking clearly, hearing aids, or cochlear implants) or sight (signing within a restricted visual field, writing with large print)
 Tactile signing, sign language, or a manual alphabet such as the American Manual Alphabet or Deaf-blind Alphabet (also known as "two-hand manual") with tactile or visual modifications
 Interpreting services (such as sign-language interpreters or communication aides)
 Communication devices such as Tellatouch or its computerized versions known as the TeleBraille and Screen Braille Communicator.
 Tadoma, a tactile modality
 Protactile, a tactile language related to American Sign Language in the Francosign language family

Multisensory methods have been used to help deafblind people enhance their communication skills. These can be taught to very young children with developmental delays (to help with pre-intentional communication), young people with learning difficulties, and older people, including those with dementia. One such process is Tacpac.

Deafblind people often use the assistance of people known as support-service providers (SSPs), who help the deafblind with tasks such as routine errands, guiding the deafblind through unfamiliar environments, and facilitating communication between the deafblind person and another person.

Technology

Braille equipment includes a variety of multipurpose devices, which enhance access to distance communication. Some can be used as stand-alone devices connected via Wi-Fi, while others are paired with a mobile device to provide tactile access to e-mail, text messaging, and other modern communication resources. To receive Braille equipment, an eligible consumer must be proficient in Braille and must have access to the Internet or cellular telephone service.

Telebraille does not have a computer communications modem, but does have a TTY (TDD) modem. It was designed as a TTY for deaf-blind people and is also useful for face-to-face conversation. It has two components: The sighted component is a modified SuperCom TTY device. It has a qwerty keyboard and a single-line LED display. The display is regular size and is not particularly suited to people with low vision. The SuperCom TTY can be connected directly to the telephone line using a conventional telephone jack or the telephone receiver can be coupled to the SuperCom on a cradle on top of the device. Text flows past the display in a continuous stream, like tickertape. The SuperCom is connected to the Braille portion of the device by a cable that is about 2 ft (0.6 m) long. The Braille display is about 15 characters in width, although a knockout allows additional characters to be installed, at considerable additional cost. The Telebraille is able to communicate in ASCII mode, but is not compatible with conventional computer modems. There is what looks like a RS-232 socket on the back of the Braille component, but the instructions for the Telebraille state that this jack is for "future use" and that no computer devices should be attached to it.

A graphic Braille display can be used in sensing graphic data such as maps, images, and text data that require multiline display capabilities such spreadsheets and equations. Graphic braille displays available in the market are DV-2 (from KGS), Hyperbraille, and TACTISPLAY Table/Walk (from Tactisplay Corp.). For example, TACTISPLAY Table can show 120*100 resolution refreshable braille graphics on one page.

In popular culture
The play The Miracle Worker (1959), which was adapted into the film The Miracle Worker (1962), recounts Anne Sullivan's efforts to draw Helen Keller from her world of blindness and deafness.

The Who’s album Tommy (1969) tells one continuous life story about a deafblind mute boy named Tommy through songs.

The Bollywood film Black (2005) featured Rani Mukerji as a deafblind character named Michelle McNally.

The film Marie's Story (2014) relates the childhood and education of Marie Heurtin (1885–1921), a deafblind woman.

Haben Girma, the first deafblind individual to graduate from Harvard Law School, released an autobiography entitled Haben: The Deafblind Woman Who Conquered Harvard Law (2019).

Feeling Through (2019) is an American short drama film directed by Doug Roland that was the first film ever to star a deafblind actor (Robert Tarango) in a lead role; it is about a teenager and a deafblind man. It was nominated for the 2021 Academy Award for Best Live Action Short Film.

See also 
Tangible symbol systems
Tommy (rock opera)
White cane (used by blind people to assist them in walking)

References

External links 

The National Center On Deaf-Blindness Official informational website on deafblindness in United States.
The Helen Keller National Center for Deaf-Blind Youths and Adults Helen Keller Services website catering for the deaf-blind and blind communities.
World Federation of the Deafblind Website for worldwide information concerning deafblindness. 
Able Australia Informational website on deafblindness in Australia. 
"Haben Girma Homepage" About Haben Girma, the first deafblind Harvard Law School graduate.
Deafblind UK is a national charity in the UK supporting people with sight and hearing loss to live the lives they want.
Sense is a national charity in England, Wales and Northern Ireland for everyone who is deafblind, there to help people communicate and experience the world.

 
Deaf culture